In number theory, the odd greedy expansion problem asks whether a greedy algorithm for finding Egyptian fractions with odd denominators always succeeds. , it remains unsolved.

Description
An Egyptian fraction represents a given rational number as a sum of distinct unit fractions. If a rational number  is a sum of unit fractions with odd denominators,

then  must be odd. Conversely, every fraction  with  odd can be represented as a sum of distinct odd unit fractions.

This method is called the odd greedy algorithm and the expansions it creates are called odd greedy expansions.

Stein, Selfridge, Graham, and others have posed the question of whether the odd greedy algorithm terminates with a finite expansion for every  with  odd. , this question remains open.

Example 

Let  = 4/23.

23/4 = 5; the next larger odd number is 7. So the first step expands

161/5 = 32; the next larger odd number is 33. So the next step expands

5313/4 = 1328; the next larger odd number is 1329. So the third step expands

Since the final term in this expansion is a unit fraction, the process terminates with this expansion as its result.

Fractions with long expansions 

It is possible for the odd greedy algorithm to produce expansions that are shorter than the usual greedy expansion, with smaller denominators. For instance,

where the left expansion is the greedy expansion and the right expansion is the odd greedy expansion. However, the odd greedy expansion is more typically long, with large denominators. For instance, as Wagon discovered, the odd greedy expansion for 3/179 has 19 terms, the largest of which is approximately 1.415×10439491. Curiously, the numerators of the fractions to be expanded in each step of the algorithm form a sequence of consecutive integers:

A similar phenomenon occurs with other numbers, such as 5/5809 (an example found independently by K. S. Brown and David Bailey) which has a 27-term expansion. Although the denominators of this expansion are difficult to compute due to their enormous size, the numerator sequence may be found relatively efficiently using modular arithmetic.  describes several additional examples of this type found by Broadhurst, and notes that K. S. Brown has described methods for finding fractions with arbitrarily long expansions.

On even denominators
The odd greedy algorithm cannot terminate when given a fraction with an even denominator, because these fractions do not have finite representations with odd denominators. Therefore, in this case, it produces an infinite series expansion of its input. For instance Sylvester's sequence can be viewed as generated by the odd greedy expansion of 1/2.

Notes

References

External links 
 MathPages - Odd-Greedy Unit Fraction Expansions, K. S. Brown

Egyptian fractions
Unsolved problems in number theory